Olof-Palme-Allee is the final stop on the Bonn Stammstrecke in Germany. Lines 66 and 68 beyond that point do not continue to Bad Godesberg, but on the Siebengebirgsbahn towards Ramersdorf and Bad Honnef.

Cologne-Bonn Stadtbahn stations
Buildings and structures in Bonn